South Cotabato's 2nd congressional district is one of the two congressional districts of the Philippines in the province of South Cotabato. It has been represented in the House of Representatives since 1987. The district covers the provincial capital city, Koronadal, and seven adjacent municipalities, namely Banga, Lake Sebu, Norala, Santo Niño, Surallah, Tantangan and T'boli. It is currently represented in the 18th Congress by Ferdinand L. Hernandez of the PDP–Laban.

Representation history

Election results

2019

2016

2013

2010

See also
Legislative districts of South Cotabato

References

Congressional districts of the Philippines
Politics of South Cotabato
1987 establishments in the Philippines
Congressional districts of Soccsksargen
Constituencies established in 1987